James L. Bailey (born May 21, 1957) is an American former professional basketball player.  A 6'9" (2.06 m) forward/center from Rutgers University, he was selected with the 6th pick of the 1979 NBA draft by the Seattle SuperSonics.  Nicknamed "Jammin' James," he spent 9 seasons (1979–1988) in the National Basketball Association (NBA), playing for the Sonics as well as the New Jersey Nets, Houston Rockets, New York Knicks, and Phoenix Suns.  He ended his NBA career with 5,246 total points. 

While at Rutgers, Bailey was a formidable player, displaying a strong inside presence in addition to possessing great leaping ability.  He was famous for his conversion of "alley oop" passes into slam dunks. The rule allowing dunking was re-instituted in college basketball beginning with the 1976–77 season, Bailey's sophomore year.  Bailey's slam dunks were an immediate sensation at Rutgers, and Bailey led the team with 88 dunks as a sophomore.  He increased this number to 116 as a junior. However, as a senior, he was met with constant double and triple teaming, and Rutgers' opponents "held" him to 79 dunks as a senior.

The Scarlet Knights advanced to the NCAA basketball Final Four in 1976, Bailey's freshman year, arriving with a 31–0 record.  However, they were defeated by Michigan in the national semi finals, and then lost to UCLA in the 3rd place (consolation) game.

Bailey is number three on the Rutgers all-time scoring list (2,034 points), and second in career rebounds behind Phil Sellers (1,047). He is also the second leading shot-blocker in Rutgers history behind Roy Hinson.

Bailey went on to capture All-America honors from UPI and The Sporting News in 1978. 

Bailey's #20 jersey was retired by Rutgers in 1993, and he was inducted into the Rutgers Hall of Fame in the same year.

See also
List of NCAA Division I men's basketball players with 2000 points and 1000 rebounds

References

External links
James Bailey at basketball-reference.com

1957 births
Living people
All-American college men's basketball players
American expatriate basketball people in Italy
American men's basketball players
Basketball players from Georgia (U.S. state)
Centers (basketball)
Fabriano Basket players
Houston Rockets players
New Jersey Nets players
New York Knicks players
People from Dublin, Georgia
Rutgers Scarlet Knights men's basketball players
Scaligera Basket Verona players
Seattle SuperSonics draft picks
Seattle SuperSonics players
Xaverian Brothers High School alumni